Dilawar Khan was a governor of the Malwa province of Central India and laterly Sultan of the Malwa Sultanate during the decline of the Delhi Sultanate. After serving at the court in Delhi, he was appointed governor at Dhar in A.H. 793/C.E. 1390–91. Dilawar Khan took the title of 'Amid Shāh Dā'ūd and caused the khutba to be read in his name in A.H. 804/C.E. 1401–02. He passed his kingdom – the Malwa Sultanate – to his son Hoshang Shah upon his death in A.H. 809/C.E. 1406.

Dilawar Khan in the reign of the  Later Tughluqs (1391/92 - 1401/02)

Dilawar Khan was the follower of Firuz Shah Tughluq's son, Muhammad ibn Firuz, later known as Muhammad Shah. He was imprisoned by the court officials at Delhi for his support for the rebel prince. Not only Dilawar Khan, but many important provincial governors, such as that of Gujarat, and various other important and powerful nobles of the court supported the Prince' claim to the throne. After Timur's invasion in 1398, the same prince, who was the then Sultan of Delhi, ran away from the capital and sought shelter, first in the Gujarat Sultanate, but receiving a less than enthusiastic response there, moved to the Malwa Sultanate. Dilawar Khan is said to have welcomed him with open arms and told him that his Sultanate and treasure was all for the service of the Delhi Sultan.

References
Citations

Bibliography

History of Malwa
1406 deaths
Year of birth unknown
Pashtun people
Indian people of Afghan descent
Delhi Sultanate